Donna Kate Rushin (born 1951), popularly known as Kate Rushin, is a Black lesbian poet. Rushin's prefatory poem, "The Bridge Poem", to the 1981 collection This Bridge Called My Back is considered iconic. She currently lives in Connecticut.

Education
Rushin was raised in Lawnside, New Jersey. She obtained a Bachelor of Art's degree from Oberlin College, and a Master of Fine Arts degree from Brown University. In 2021, she became Poet in Residence in the English Department of Connecticut College.

Publications
 The Black Back-Ups (Firebrand Books, 1993).
 "After the Accident." Callaloo 23, no. 1 (2000): 192–193.
 "Word Problems." Callaloo 23, no. 1 (2000): 190–191.
 "Reeling Memories For My Father." Callaloo 23, no. 1 (2000): 188–189. Reprinted in Callaloo 24, no. 3 (2001): 885–86.
 "The Tired Poem: Lost Letter from a Typical Unemployed Black Professional Woman." In Feminism and Community, edited by Weiss Penny A. and Friedman Marilyn, 77–82. Temple University Press, 1995. Reprinted in Home Girls: A Black Feminist Anthology, ed. Barbara Smith (Rutgers University Press, 2000): 247–251.
 "The Black Back-Ups." Home Girls: A Black Feminist Anthology, ed. Barbara Smith (Rutgers University Press, 2000): 60–63.
 "Instructions from the Flight Crew to a Poet of African Descent Living in a State of Emergency." Callaloo 22, no. 4 (1999): 976–976.
 "Rosa Revisited" in Teaching the art of poetry: the moves, A, Baron Wormser and A, David Cappella (Routledge, 1999): 305–306.
 "A Pacifist Becomes Militant and Declares War." In My Lover is a Woman – Contemporary Lesbian Love Poems, Lesléa Newman (Ballantine Books, 1999): 211–214.
 "Six Poems." The Radical Teacher, no. 42 (1992): 22–23.
 "Comparative History: Our Stories." Callaloo, no. 39 (1989): 290-91.
 "Living in My Head." The Women's Review of Books 1, no. 2 (1983): 15.
 "The Brick Layers." The Women's Review of Books 1, no. 2 (1983): 15.
 "This Bridge Poem." In This Bridge Called My Back: Writings by Radical Women of Color, edited by Cherríe Moraga and Gloria E. Anzaldúa (Kitchen Table Press, 1983; reprinted State University of New York Press Albany, 2015): xxxiii-xxxiv. Republished in Feminist Theory Reader: Local and Global Perspectives, ed. Carole McCann and Seung-kyung Kim (Routledge, 2013): 266–267.

Awards
Rose Low Rome Memorial Poetry Prize
Grolier Poetry Prize

References

External links 
 Official website

1951 births
Living people
20th-century African-American women writers
20th-century African-American writers
20th-century American poets
20th-century American women writers
21st-century African-American women writers
21st-century African-American writers
21st-century American poets
21st-century American women writers
African-American poets
American lesbian writers
American LGBT poets
American women poets